Queen + Adam Lambert Rock Big Ben Live was a concert on New Year's Eve 2014 and New Years Day 2015 performed by Queen + Adam Lambert to celebrate the New Year in the UK. It was performed in the shadow of Big Ben in Central Hall Westminster in Central London.

The concert was broadcast live on BBC One from 23:15 to 00:30. From around 23:59 to 00:10, the show paused for the chimes of the Big Ben in the New Year countdown and the firework display in London. The band returned with after the fireworks ended. The TV coverage was presented by BBC Radio 1 DJs Greg James and Gemma Cairney. There was also a live stream on BBC Music.

Setlist

 "Don't Stop Me Now"
 "I Want to Break Free" 
 "Somebody to Love"
 "Another One Bites the Dust"
 "Under Pressure"
 "Fat Bottomed Girls"
 "Radio Ga Ga"
 "I Want It All"
 "Crazy Little Thing Called Love"
 "The Show Must Go On" Encore:
 "Bohemian Rhapsody"/"Killer Queen" medley
 "We Will Rock You"
 "We Are The Champions"
 "God Save the Queen (Instrumental played from tape)"

Notes

 "Bohemian Rhapsody" featured vocals & piano from a recording of Freddie Mercury from Queen Rock Montreal.  
 The start of "We Will Rock You" featured bagpipes.
 Also, A Kind of Magic was used for the opening and closing credits for the TV coverage.
 During the rehearsals, "Drowse" was performed - though it wasn't performed on the tour.

TV Ratings
The first part of the concert had an average overnight viewing figure of 5.83 million and the second part had 10 million viewers.

Band
Brian May - guitar, vocals 
Roger Taylor - drums, percussion, vocals 
Adam Lambert - vocals
Spike Edney - keyboards, backing vocals
Neil Fairclough - bass, backing vocals
Rufus Tiger Taylor - percussion, drums, backing vocals
Freddie Mercury - pre-recorded piano & vocals on "Bohemian Rhapsody"
John Jamieson - bagpipes on "We Will Rock You"

References

2014 in British music
2014 in London
2014 television specials
2015 in British music
2015 in London
2015 television specials
Queen + Adam Lambert
Concerts in the United Kingdom
Music in London
New Year's television specials
2014 in British television
2015 in British television